("Center Of The World Is Osaka : Namba Autonomous Region") is the second album by NMB48. It was released on August 13, 2014. It debuted at number one on the weekly Oricon Albums Chart and, as of August 25 (issue date), it has sold 325,249 copies.

Track listings 
All lyrics written by Yasushi Akimoto.

Type-N

Type-M

Type-B

Theater Edition

Charts

Year-end charts

References

Further reading

External links 
  

2014 albums
NMB48 albums